Ukraine competed at the 2011 Summer Universiade in Shenzhen, China, from 12 to 23 August 2011. 293 athletes formed the Ukrainian. They competed in archery, athletics, basketball, beach volleyball, chess, cycling, diving, fencing, football, gymnastics, judo, shooting, swimming, table tennis, taekwondo, tennis, volleyball, and weightlifting. Ukraine was not represented in badminton, golf, sailing, and water polo.

Ukraine won 45 medals, including 12 gold medals, and ranked 6th.

Medal summary

Medal by sports

Medalists

See also
 Ukraine at the 2011 Winter Universiade

References

Nations at the 2011 Summer Universiade
2011 in Ukrainian sport
2011